Fingers in the Noise is the alias of French electronic musician Laurent Bisch.

Born in 1966, Bisch started producing music in the late 1980s, after taking several piano lessons.
His musical genres include dub, ambient, and experimental music.
Bisch is married, and has three children.

Early life
Laurent Bisch was born in France on 28 January 1966.
During the late 1980s, Bisch took several piano lessons, which inspired him to start creating his own music.

Music
Bisch developed a passion for deep dub and ambient music. He would also frequently spend his time at all-night parties.
In 1990 he bought his first synthesizer, a Korg 01/WFD. It was a "workstation that introduced [him] to the creation of synthetic sounds".
In 1995, Bisch bought his first personal computer. He discovered, and began to experiment with, software such as Cubase, FruityLoops, ACID Pro and ReBirth RB-338.
Bisch stated in an interview: "The fact that I could work on a screen with all the tools and opportunities offered by this kind of software, I realized that I had found my happiness!".
Bisch says that musical creation provides a form of therapy for him, and allows him to get over his problems.
When he was 19, Bisch began discovering night life, and attended raves.
He has also lived in the island of Ibiza and Tenerife (Canary island) for five years.

Musical breakthrough
In 2009, Bisch decided to stop attending long all-night parties, and instead pursue a more peaceful family life with his wife and three children, after his mother died.
He began devoting his free time towards musical composition, and has published some of his releases on websites like SoundCloud, MySpace, and Facebook.
Bisch began releasing EPs during the year 2010, on various netlabels.
That same year, he also founded his own record label, called Fitn Personal Records.

Personal life
Apart from composing music, Bisch also enjoys cooking, working on 3D computer graphics, and photography.

Discography

Studio albums
2011 - 3 x 11 (11/11/11) (Fitn Personal Records – FPR#002)
2012 - Sounds From the Moon (Bine Music)

EPs
2010 - Kool Reaktion
2010 - Smooth Box 
2010 - Apero Beats 
2010 - Abstract Shadows 
2010 - Light as a Butterfly 
2011 - Discret Lounge 
2011 - Retroactive 
2013 - Insomnia
2013 - Scotchage
2014 - Saw Deep

Remixes
2012 - Lost in Freezing Fog

References

External links 

 
 Interview with Laurent Bisch (in French)

French electronic musicians
Dub musicians
Ambient musicians
1966 births
Living people